Iguchi (written 井口 literally "well mouth") is a Japanese surname. Notable people with the surname include:

Bryan Iguchi, a professional snowboarder
Miyuki Iguchi, Japanese athlete
Motonari Iguchi (井口 基成), pianist
, Japanese film director, screenwriter and editor
Naruhito Iguchi (井口 成人), actor and voice actor
Noboru Iguchi (井口 昇), film director and actor 
Tadahito Iguchi (井口 資仁), professional baseball player
Toshihide Iguchi (井口 俊英), government bond trader 
Yuka Iguchi (井口 裕香), voice actress

See also
5561 Iguchi, a main-belt asteroid 

Japanese-language surnames